Ross Popplewell (born 1952) was an Australian rugby league player in the 1970s.

Ross Popplewell was one of the youngest players to play first grade in the modern era. He played most of the 1970 season in Reserve Grade while also playing schoolboy football in his final year at Blakehurst High School in Sydney's south where he was also the school captain. He was promoted to first grade by coach Jack Gibson on one occasion in 1970 aged 18.

References

Australian rugby league players
St. George Dragons players
Living people
1952 births
Rugby league fullbacks
Rugby league wingers
Rugby league players from Sydney